Ricardo "Ricky" Gerhard is a guitarist mainly known for his playing in the band LaFee, a platinum selling pop/rock group especially successful in Germany and Europe. He left LaFee in December 2009. Garcia graduated in 2002 from Berklee College of Music in Boston with a diploma in professional music.

Ricardo was working as a guitar instructor before the success with LaFee. He released his solo record, Let Sleeping Dogs Lie in 2008, with a guest appearance by Jordan Rudess from Dream Theater.

He released his first instructional DVD "Learn & Play your music" for Cort Guitars.

Ricardo is also a composer for film, computer game and TV commercials music.

Discography

Ricky Garcia
1999 - 1
2000 - 2
2008 - Let Sleeping Dogs Lie

DVDs:
2010 - Cort Guitars - Learn & Play your music/ Instructional DVD

Music videos:
2008 - "Steinberg CC121 - MR816 CSX Music Video"
2011 - "Steinberg Cubase 6 Promotion Video"

Sound Content:
2011 - Steinberg Nu Metal VST Sound Loop Set
2013 - Steinberg Platinum Guitars VST Sound Loop Set
2013 - Steinberg Guitar Spheres VST Sound Loop Set

Video Games:
2012 - Caveman Craig 2

TV Commercials:
2013 - Jacobs Krönung Coffee

Lafee

Albums:
2006 - Lafee (Bravo Edition)
2007 - Jetzt erst recht
2007 - Jetzt erst recht (Bravo Edition)
2008 - Shut up
2009 - Ring frei
2009 - Best Of Lafee (Tag Edition)
2009 - Best Of Lafee (Nacht Edition)

Singles:
2006 - "Virus"
2006 - "Prinzesschen"
2006 - "Was Ist Das"
2006 - "Mitternacht"
2007 - "Heul doch"
2007 - "Beweg dein Arsch"
2007 - "Wer bin ich"
2008 - "Ring frei"
2009 - "Scheiss Liebe"

DVDs:
2006 - Secret Live
2007 - Jetzt erst recht mit VIVA
2007 - Wer Bin Ich - Ein ungeschminktes Märchen

Music videos:
2006 - "Virus"
2006 - "Prinzesschen"
2006 - "Was ist das"
2006 - "Mitternacht"
2007 - "Heul doch"
2007 - "Beweg dein Arsch"
2007 - "Wer bin ich"
2008 - "Shut up"
2008 - "Ring Frei"
2009 - "Scheiss Liebe"
2009 - "Der Regen fällt"

Jordan Rudess
2007 - The Road Home

References

Jordan Rudess Solo Album (The Road Home)
Lafee Wikipedia (engl.)
ECHO (music award) Wikipedia (engl.)
Official Lafee Website (de.)
Cort's official website
Steinberg Interview

External links
ricardogerhard.com
Instagram
IMDb

Living people
German guitarists
German male guitarists
Year of birth missing (living people)
Musicians from Cologne